Halystes chimaera is a species of extremely small deep water sea snail, a marine gastropod mollusk in the family Seguenziidae.

References

External links
 To Antarctic Invertebrates
 To Encyclopedia of Life
 To USNM Invertebrate Zoology Mollusca Collection
 To World Register of Marine Species

chimaera
Gastropods described in 1988